Jon Bokenkamp (born September 9, 1974 in Kearney, Nebraska) is an American writer and producer best known for his role in writing the screenplays for Taking Lives and The Call, and creating the NBC series The Blacklist along with The Blacklist: Redemption.

He was involved in theater and music as a student at Kearney High School, attended the University of Nebraska at Kearney, then went to the School of Cinematic Arts at the University of Southern California.

Bokenkamp was encouraged to enter a script writing competition by friend and fellow Nebraskan, Todd Nelson, creator of the Nebraska Coast Connection. After winning the competition, Jon landed an agent and his first paid assignment, rewriting a horror film for Exorcist director William Friedkin.

Success allowed Bokenkamp to return to his hometown where he earned the 2013 Hub Freedom Award for his work restoring the historic World Theater in downtown Kearney, Nebraska.

Bokenkamp was awarded with an honorary doctorate in musical arts from University of Nebraska at Kearney in May 2019.

Filmography

Films

Television

References

External links
 
 

American television producers
American television writers
American male television writers
Living people
Showrunners
People from Kearney, Nebraska
Film directors from Nebraska
Screenwriters from Nebraska
The Blacklist (TV series)
University of Nebraska alumni
USC School of Cinematic Arts alumni
1974 births